William Sumner Appleton Jr. (May 29, 1874 – November 24, 1947) was founder of the Society for the Preservation of New England Antiquities (SPNEA) in 1910. He was the chief force behind much of the preservation of historic homes in the New England area.

Early life
Appleton was born on May 29, 1874, in Boston to William Sumner Appleton (1840–1903) and Edith Stuart (d. 1892).  As a boy he lived at 39 Beacon Street (also known as the Nathan Appleton Residence). He was from an old and wealthy family. 

He was educated at Hopkinson's School for Boys, Boston, and graduated from Harvard College in 1896.

Career
Appleton worked tirelessly to promote preservation of buildings from the 17th, 18th, and early 19th centuries. He focused on buildings that were aesthetically pleasing, had historic significance, and could be independently supported. His method of preservation focused on cautious, deliberate restoration only when experts were involved and restorations were reversible. When he died in 1947, the SPNEA had grown tremendously and remains a strong and active organization today. Renamed Historic New England, the organization owns thirty-six historic properties.

Personal life
Around 1916, Appleton lived on Spruce Street in Boston.

Appleton died on November 24, 1947, in Lawrence, Massachusetts. He is buried in a plot with his sister, Marjorie, who preceded him in death by 34 years, aged about 38.

References

Further reading

Works by Appleton
 Birthplace of Samuel Gilman. The Harvard graduates' magazine, v.26, no.102, 1917; p. 225+
 Destruction and preservation of old buildings in New England. Art and Archaeology, v.8, no.3, p. 131-183. Colonial art number. May–June 1919.

Works about Appleton
 Bertram Kimball Little. William Sumner Appleton. Proceedings of the Massachusetts Historical Society, Third Series, Vol. 69 (October, 1947-May 1950), pp. 422–425.
 Edward P. Alexander. Sixty Years of Historic Preservation: The Society for the Preservation of New England Antiquities. Old-Time New England. Volume: 61 Number: 221 Issue: Summer, 1970.
 N. Coolidge. William Sumner Appleton and the Society for the Preservation of New England Antiquities. The Magazine Antiques. March 1986. Vol.129.
 James M. Lindgren. "A Constant Incentive to Patriotic Citizenship": Historic Preservation in Progressive-Era Massachusetts. The New England Quarterly, Vol. 64, No. 4 (December 1991), pp. 594–608.
 James Michael Lindgren. "'It belongs to men like you.' William Sumner Appleton and the makings of a preservationist." Preserving historic New England: preservation, progressivism, and the remaking of memory. Oxford University Press US, 1995; p. 15+
 James M. Lindgren. "A New Departure in Historic, Patriotic Work": Personalism, Professionalism, and Conflicting Concepts of Material Culture in the Late Nineteenth and Early Twentieth Centuries. The Public Historian, Vol. 18, No. 2 (Spring, 1996), pp. 41–60.
 James M. Lindgren. "The Blow Which Civilization Has Suffered": American Preservationists and the Great War, 1914-1919. The Public Historian, Vol. 27, No. 3 (Summer, 2005), pp. 27–56.

External links

1874 births
1947 deaths
Appleton family
Harvard College alumni
American philanthropists
Historical preservationists
People from Beacon Hill, Boston